Pityrodia canaliculata is a flowering plant in the mint family Lamiaceae and is endemic to a small area in Western Australia. It is a many-branched shrub with all its parts, except the petals covered with small, circular scales. The tube-shaped flowers are white with reddish spots inside.

Description
The leaves are dark green, arranged in opposite pairs and covered with similar scales to those on the branches.

The upper half of the tube is covered with scales on the outside and there is a dense hairy ring inside the tube at the base of the stamens. The lower central lobe at the end of the tube is elliptic to almost round,  in diameter while the other four lobes are narrower and shorter. The four stamens extend slightly beyond the end of the tube, the lower pair longer than the upper pair.

Taxonomy and naming
Pityrodia canaliculata was first formally described in 1967 by Alex George from a specimen collected west of Sandstone, and the description was published in Journal of the Royal Society of Western Australia. The specific epithet (canaliculata) is a Latin word meaning "canaliculate" or "channelled", referring to the leaves.

Distribution and habitat
This pityrodia grows in red sand near Sandstone in the Murchison biogeographic region.

Conservation
Pityrodia canaliculata is classified as "Priority One" by the Government of Western Australia Department of Parks and Wildlife, meaning that it is known from only one or a few locations which are potentially at risk.

References

canaliculata
Plants described in 1967
Flora of Western Australia
Taxa named by Alex George